Galwadukumbura  is a village in Sri Lanka. It is located within Central Province.

It’s terrain is 424 meters above the sea level.

See also
List of towns in Central Province, Sri Lanka

External links

Populated places in Matale District